Mont Pelvoux is a mountain in the Massif des Écrins in the French Alps. It stands  in elevation.

For many years, Mont Pelvoux was believed to be the tallest mountain in the region, since the taller Barre des Écrins cannot be seen from the Durance valley.

The summit of the mountain is called Pointe Puiseux. There are three subpeaks: 
 Pointe Durand
 Petit Pelvoux
 Trois Dents du Pelvoux

Ascents 
The first ascent of Mont Pelvoux was by Captain Durand and the two chamois hunters Alexis Liotard and Jacques-Etienne Matheoud on July 30, 1828. This party returned, with more people, to the summit in 1830. Both times they climbed the "Pointe Durand".

The highest point is named after the astronomer Victor Puiseux, who reached it first with his guide Pierre Antoine Barnéoud on August 9, 1848. Barnéoud had been the third guide in the 1830 re-ascent.

See also

List of mountains of the Alps above 3000 m

References

External links 
 Mont Pelvoux on SummitPost
 Mont Pelvoux at PeakBagger
 The geology of Mont Pelvoux (in French)

Mountains of Hautes-Alpes
Alpine three-thousanders
Mountains of the Alps